Diospyros curranii is a tree in the family Ebenaceae. Habitat is mixed dipterocarp forests from sea-level to  altitude. D. curranii is found in Indochina and from west Malesia to the Philippines.

References

curranii
Plants described in 1909
Trees of Indo-China
Trees of Malesia